John Alexander Milligan (January 22, 1904 – May 15, 1972) was a pitcher in Major League Baseball who played from  through  for the Philadelphia Phillies (1928–1931) and Washington Senators (1934). A native of Schuylerville, New York, he attended Cornell University.

In a five-season career, Mulligan posted a 3–8 record with 38 strikeouts and a 5.17 ERA in 35 appearances, including 12 starts, four complete games and  innings of work.

Milligan died at the age of 68 in Fort Pierce, Florida.

External links

Retrosheet

Philadelphia Phillies players
Washington Senators (1901–1960) players
Major League Baseball pitchers
Cornell Big Red baseball players
Baseball players from New York (state)
1904 births
1972 deaths